Manuel Vieira de Matos (22 March 1861 – 28 September 1932) was Bishop of Guarda, Archbishop of Braga, and the founder of the Corpo Nacional de Escutas - Escutismo Católico Português.

He was born in Poiares, Peso da Régua. On 1 April 1903 he became the Bishop of  Guarda, and on 1 October 1914 he became Archbishop of Braga.

In Braga in 1923, Manuel Vieira de Matos and Dr. Avelino Gonçalves founded the largest Scouting organization in Portugal, the Corpo Nacional de Escutas - Escutismo Católico Português (CNE).  In 1929 the organization was accepted as member by the World Scout Bureau. He died in Braga, Portugal.

See also

External links
 Archbishop Manuel Vieira de Matos Catholic-Hierarchy;
  Metropolitan Archdiocese of Braga GCatholic.org;

References
This article is based in part on material from the Portuguese Wikipedia.

1861 births
1932 deaths
People from Peso da Régua
20th-century Roman Catholic archbishops in Portugal
Scouting pioneers
Roman Catholic archbishops of Braga
Scouting and Guiding in Portugal